The Strathclyde Group is a geological group found in the Midland Valley of Scotland. It preserves fossils of Visean age (early Carboniferous period).

See also

 List of fossiliferous stratigraphic units in Scotland

References

 

Carboniferous System of Europe
Carboniferous Scotland